Boscobel is a civil parish in the east of Shropshire, England, on the border with Staffordshire. To the north is the Staffordshire village of Bishops Wood.

According to the 2001 census it had a population of 12. Because of its small population, it shares a parish council with the neighbouring Donington parish. It is the smallest parish in Shropshire by population – the smallest by area is Deuxhill.

Boscobel House 
It is the site of Boscobel House, home to the Giffard family, owners of the Boscobel Royal Oak, where Charles II hid in an oak tree after losing the Battle of Worcester in 1651.

A historical romance on the subject was published as Boscobel in 1871 by William Harrison Ainsworth.

The "pine groves of Boscobel" are mentioned (twice) by Charles Kinbote, narrator of Vladimir Nabokov's 1962 postmodern novel Pale Fire, in descriptions of his escape from Zembla.

White Ladies Priory

Also in the parish is White Ladies Priory.

See also
Escape of Charles II
Listed buildings in Boscobel

References

External links

Hamlets in Shropshire
Civil parishes in Shropshire